"" is a song by Japanese voice actor and singer Mamoru Miyano and was released on July 13, 2011 as his sixth single. It was used as the opening theme song of the 2011 anime series Uta no Prince-sama: Maji Love 1000%, the first season of the Uta no Prince-sama anime series.

Background
"Orphée" is the opening theme song of Uta no Prince-sama: Maji Love 1000%, which Miyano co-starred in as Tokiya Ichinose. The single was released on July 13, 2011, and also included the tracks "Moonlight" and "Stand Up Soul."

"Moonlight" served as the ending theme songs to Miyano's radio programs, Mamoru Miyano's M-1 Grand Prix! and Mamoru Miyano's Radio Smile. Miyano described "Moonlight" as a "gentle" and "emotional" song on his blog, comparing the song to the "soft moonlight" late at night.

"Stand Up Soul" was the opening theme song to Miyano's radio program, Mamoru Miyano's M-1 Grand Prix! Miyano described it as an "energetic" song, which he had written in hopes of cheering up his audience after the 2011 Tōhoku earthquake and tsunami.

Reception

The single ranked #10 on the Oricon Weekly Singles Chart. "Orphée" was ranked #26 on Billboard Japan Hot 100 and #3 on Billboard Japan Hot Animation.

Track listing

Charts

References

2011 singles
2011 songs
Anime songs
J-pop songs
Japanese-language songs
King Records (Japan) singles
Animated series theme songs